Thenkarai may refer to places in India:

 Thenkarai, Coimbatore, Tamil Nadu
 Thenkarai, Theni, Tamil Nadu
 Thenkarai, Madhurai, Tamil Nadu